was a Japanese samurai family which descended from the Seiwa-Genji.

History
The family origins were in Mino Province.  In the early Edo period, the Sengoku were at Komoro Domain.  In 1706, the family was moved to Izushi Domain with 30,000 koku revenues.  The clan remained in Tajima Province until the  end of the Edo period. The head of the clan became a kazoku viscount in the Meiji period.

Select list of clan members

 Sengoku Hisamori
 Sengoku Hidehisa
 Sengoku Tadamasa

References

External links
 "Komoro" at Edo 300 

Japanese clans